King Peak is the southernmost summit above  in the Ruby Mountains of Elko County, in northeastern Nevada in the western United States. To the west is Rattlesnake Canyon, and to the east is Overland Creek Canyon, which drains into the Ruby Valley). The Ruby Crest National Recreation Trail passes just to the east on its way north from Overland Lake.

The peak is named for Clarence King, who explored this region in 1869 during the Geological Exploration of the Fortieth Parallel and later became first chief of the United States Geological Survey.

References

External links

Ruby Mountains
Mountains of Nevada
Mountains of Elko County, Nevada
Humboldt–Toiyabe National Forest